Sub Zero is a 2005 Canadian action film directed by Jim Wynorski (under the alias Jay Andrews) and starring Costas Mandylor, Linden Ashby, and Nia Peeples.

Plot
After a satellite containing classified information crashes into a mountain peak, a team of experienced climbers and military personnel must race to retrieve the sensitive data despite the risk of an impending blizzard and avalanche.

Cast
 Costas Mandylor as John Deckert
 Nia Peeples as Kelli Paris
 Linden Ashby as Soloman Davis
 Michael Sunczyk as Mike Foster
 Jim Thorburn as Mike Frazier
 Colin Lawrence as Pete Tanner
 Jacqueline Samuda as Sasha Mirov
 Mike Dopud as Dr. Petrov Jenko
 Zoran Vukelic as Ivan Salatka
 Michael Ryan as Martin Cook
 Alistair Abell as Lieutenant Charles Brill
 Dalia Blake as Officer McCoy
 Michael Kopsa as President James Jordan
 Tim Henry as Secretariat TJ Stocker
 Bruce Dawson as Secretariat Roger Banks
 Alex Bruhanski as Ivan Gregerov
 Kiara Hunter as Major Tamara Holbrook
 Peter Graham-Gaudreau as Captain T. J. Vickwire
 Glori-Anne Gilbert as Nikki Radcliff
 Michael Debras as Pilot
 Ari Solomon as Leader
 John Sampson as Walker
 Taras Kostyuk as Boxer

References

External links

2005 films
2000s action adventure films
Canadian action adventure films
English-language Canadian films
CineTel Films films
Films directed by Jim Wynorski
Mountaineering films
Avalanches in film
2000s English-language films
2000s Canadian films